Nightclub Version of the Eternal is an album by The Howling Hex.  It was released as a CD by Drag City in 2006.

Track listing
All songs written by the Howling Hex
"Hammer and Bluebird" – 7:25
"Lips Begin to Move" – 7:35
"This Planet Sweet" – 7:51
"How Many Steps Now" – 7:19
"Good Things Are Easy" – 7:31
"Six Pack Days" – 7:41
"Out, Out, Out" – 6:35

Personnel

The Howling Hex:
Neil Michael Hagerty – baritone guitar, vocals
Mike Saenz – electric guitar, vocals
Lyn Madison – percussion, vocals
Dan Sylvester – percussion

References

2006 albums
Howling Hex albums
Drag City (record label) albums